The 2016 Portsmouth City Council election took place on 5 May 2016 to elect members of Portsmouth City Council. This took place on the same day as other local elections taking place around the UK, including the London Mayoral election, Scottish Parliament and Welsh Assembly elections.

14 of 42 seats were contested during these elections within this unitary authority.

After this year's local elections, the composition of the council is now (compared to the situation immediately prior to the election):
Conservatives: 19 (0)
Liberal Democrats: 15 (+1)
UKIP: 4 (0)
Labour: 3 (0)
Independent: 1 (-1)
Following the election, the Conservative minority administration that had governed Portsmouth since 2014 continued in office.

Election result
Comparisons for the purpose of determining a gain, hold or loss of a seat, and for all percentage changes, is to the last time these specific seats were up for election in 2012.

Ward results

The incumbent councillor, Aiden Grey, was elected as a Liberal Democrat but defected to Labour six months after his election.

References

2016 English local elections
2016
2010s in Hampshire